The discography of U.D.O., a German heavy metal band, consists of 17 studio albums, six live albums, three compilations, 17 singles, six video albums and 19 music videos. Formed in 1987 by eponymous vocalist Udo Dirkschneider following his departure from Accept, the group originally included guitarists Mathias Dieth and Peter Szigeti, bassist Frank Rittel and drummer Thomas Franke. Shortly after the release and promotion of their debut album Animal House, Dirkschneider dismissed all band members except Dieth, and rebuilt the group with guitarist Andy Susemihl, bassist Thomas Smuszynski, and future Accept drummer Stefan Schwarzmann. Mean Machine, released in 1989, reached number 31 on the German Albums Chart. Susemihl was subsequently replaced by Wolla Böhm.

1990's Faceless World reached number 52 on the German Albums Chart. The next year's follow-up, Timebomb, failed to chart and was the last album to be released before Dirkschneider's return to Accept. U.D.O. reformed in 1997 with the album Solid, with Dirkschneider and Schwarzmann joined by former Accept drummer Stefan Kaufmann on guitar, alongside second guitarist Jürgen Graf and bassist Fitty Wienhold. The group's next release, No Limits, saw them return to the charts in Germany at number 90. With Graf and Schwarzmann replaced by Igor Gianola and Lorenzo Milani, respectively, Holy also broke into the German top 100. The band continued to make their way slowly up the albums chart, as Man and Machine reached number 71, and Thunderball reached number 83.

Francesco Jovino replaced Milani in time for Mission No. X, which reached number 92 in the band's home country. The group broke into the German top 40 for the first time since 1989 with their next release, peaking at number 32 with Mastercutor in 2007. Subsequent releases improved on this form – 2009's Dominator was the band's first top 30 album, and 2011's Rev-Raptor was their first top 20. Both guitarists had left by the time Steelhammer was released in 2013, to be replaced by Andrey Smirnov and Kasperi Heikkinen. The album reached number 21 in Germany and also registered on the US Billboard Heatseekers Albums chart at number 28. 2015's Decadent reached a new band record of number 16 in Germany, while the live album Navy Metal Night charted at number 31.

U.D.O. released Steelfactory in 2018, which was the first album to feature Dirkschneider's son Sven on drums, and the first since Heikkinen's departure. The album was the band's first to reach the German Albums Chart top 10, peaking at number 7. It also reached number 27 on the UK Rock & Metal Albums Chart, and number 9 on the Billboard Heatseekers Albums chart.

Albums

Studio albums

Live albums

Compilations

Singles

Videos

Video albums

Music videos

References

External links
U.D.O. official website

UDO
UDO